The Directorate of Archaeology is responsible for about 10 museums in the state of Punjab, India. It has responsibility for all excavations.

External links
Directorate General of Archaeology Government of Punjab, Government Organisation Facebook

State agencies of Punjab, India
Archaeology of India